Hemlock (originally called Terre Hall) is an unincorporated community in southern Taylor Township, Howard County, Indiana, United States.  It lies at the intersection of State Road 26 with County Road 450E.

Hemlock is part of the Kokomo, Indiana Metropolitan Statistical Area.

History
Hemlock was laid out in 1852. It was originally known as Terre Halle, but was renamed Hemlock before 1881.

Geography

References

Unincorporated communities in Howard County, Indiana
Unincorporated communities in Indiana
Kokomo, Indiana metropolitan area